Niranam Grandhavari (Malayalam: നിരണം ഗ്രന്ഥവരി) is the first book of history in Malayalam. Writing this book began before 1773. The subject of Niranam Grandhavari is the history of Malankara Church.

Etymology
The word Grandhavari in Malayalam means chronicle. At the time of the beginning of its writing, the primate of Malankara Church was Mar Thoma VI whose headquarters was Niranam Church. As it was primarily written at Niranam, this historical account came to be known as Niranam Grandhavari.

The manuscripts themselves do not have a name. The title 'Niranam Grandhavari' was coined by historian Edamaruku Joseph in his book Kerala Samskaram.

Author
The authorship of Niranam Grandhavari remains a matter of speculation. Some believe that it was written by Mar Thoma VI himself. There was a legend that an uninterrupted chronicle was kept by the primates (Archdeacons) of Malankara Church until 1653, which Mar Thoma VI might have used as a reference. Niranam Grandhavari itself hints about such a Chronicle of the Archdeacons, saying that it was eaten by ants at Niranam Church. However, the probability that Mar Thoma VI was the author is very low, considering that it is mentioned in some chapters that the author is writing it as per the order of Mar Thoma Metran. In addition to this, the nature of the text indicates that it was written by persons closely associated with Mar Thoma Metrans.

Manuscripts and Transcriptions
The oldest surviving palm-leaf manuscript (thaliyola) of Niranam Grandhavari comprises 179 palm leaves, with writing on both sides. The original is in the possession of Kanianthra family of Mepral. Another manuscript was kept by Karuthadathu family at Mavelikkara.

In addition to these manuscripts, several hand-written copies of this Chronicle are kept in the possession of multiple families and persons in Kerala.

Niranam Grandhavari was transcripted at Oriental Manuscript Library, Thiruvananthapuram in 1988. The transcribed version has 384 Foolscap folio pages.

Content
The content of Kanianthra Manuscript can be classified as follows:
 History of Jews till Jesus Christ
 History of Christianity
 The history of Jesus Christ
 About twelve Apostles
 Universal Church history
 Malankara Church history
 From AD 825 -1653
 From AD 1653 – 1728
 From AD 1728 – 1808
 From AD 1808 – 1829
 Malankara Church history – II
 Legend of Mar Abo and Kadamattathu Kathanar
 Pakalomattom lineage
 Later bishops
 Article about faith and heresies 
 Essays of Mar lvanios Hadiatallah.
 Catholic Church vs. Roman Church
 Leavened Vs. un- Leavened bread for Holy Eucharist
 Against idols
 Marriage of the priests
 Importance of right hand side
 The time of day-beginnings
 Arrival of Saint Thomas and a legend about Kodungallor temple
 Miscellaneous subjects
 Identification of precious stones
 Portion of a letter
 Poems of Mar lvanios

References

Malayalam-language literature